Ořechov is a municipality and village in Jihlava District in the Vysočina Region of the Czech Republic. It has about 70 inhabitants.

History
The first written mention of Ořechov is from 1355. From 1420 until the establishment of an independent municipality in 1850, Ořechov was part of the Telč estate and shared uts owners.

Ořechov was the place where a group of parachutists landed in 1942 during the Out Distance operation.

References

Villages in Jihlava District